The 2022 Plymouth State Panthers football team represented Plymouth State University as a member of the Massachusetts State Collegiate Athletic Conference (MASCAC) during the 2022 NCAA Division III football season. The Panthers, led by 19th-year head coach Paul Castonia, played their home games at Panther Field in Plymouth, New Hampshire.

Previous season

The Panthers finished the 2021 season with a record of 5–5 (5–3 in the MASCAC), which was finished tied for fourth-place.

Schedule

Game summaries

Castleton

Personnel

Coaching staff

Roster

References

Plymouth State
Plymouth State Panthers football seasons
Plymouth State Panthers football